In a Quiet Room II is the twelfth album released by country music artist Dan Seals and his only album on the TDC label. This album is his second album of acoustic versions of his older songs and a sequel to his previous album, In a Quiet Room. No singles were released from this album. Alison Krauss and Pam Tillis sing background vocals on several songs.

Track listing
 "L.O.A. (Love on Arrival)" (Dan Seals) – 4:37
 "God Must Be a Cowboy at Heart" (Seals) – 3:15
 "Nights Are Forever Without You" (Parker McGee) – 3:26
 "My Baby's Got Good Timing" (Bob McDill, Seals) – 3:07
 "Addicted" (Cheryl Wheeler) – 3:58
 "We Are One" (Seals) – 3:58
 "Still Reelin' (From Those Rock & Roll Days)" (Seals, Allen Shamblin) – 4:56
 "Three Time Loser" (Seals) – 3:11
 "My Old Yellow Car" (Thom Schuyler) – 4:07
 "Wood" (Seals) – 4:12

Personnel
 Mark Casstevens – acoustic guitar
 Paul Franklin – pedabro
 Alison Krauss – backing vocals
 Chris Leuzinger – acoustic guitar
 Tom Roady – percussion
 Dan Seals – lead vocals, backing vocals, acoustic guitar
 Pam Tillis – backing vocals
 Mark Winchester – bass guitar
 Curtis Young – backing vocals
 Andrea Zonn – viola, violin

1998 albums
Dan Seals albums